Byhåla (a derogative slang term for a boring village) is a comedy series featuring Ronny and Ragge, played by Fredde Granberg and Peter Settman. The series aired on SVT in 1991 to 1993.

References

Swedish comedy television series
1991 Swedish television series debuts
1993 Swedish television series endings
1990s Swedish television series